Salt Creek Township is one of nine townships in Decatur County, Indiana. As of the 2010 census, its population was 1,179 and it contained 483 housing units.

History
Salt Creek Township was organized in 1836.

Geography

Cities and towns 
 New Point

Unincorporated towns
 Enochsburg
 Mechanicsburg
 New Pennington
 Rossburg
 Smiths Crossing
 Smyrna
(This list is based on USGS data and may include former settlements.)

Adjacent townships
 Fugit Township (north)
 Ray Township, Franklin County (east)
 Laughery Township, Ripley County (southeast)
 Jackson Township, Ripley County (south)
 Marion Township (southwest)
 Washington Township (west)

Major highways
  Interstate 74
  Indiana State Road 46

Cemeteries
The township contains two cemeteries: Maple and Ross.

References

External links

 Indiana Township Association
 United Township Association of Indiana
 United States Census Bureau cartographic boundary files
 U.S. Board on Geographic Names

Townships in Decatur County, Indiana
Townships in Indiana
1836 establishments in Indiana
Populated places established in 1836